Springfield Commonwealth Academy is a private middle- and high school in Springfield, Massachusetts.

History
In December 2010, EC International announced it had acquired the Springfield-based - MacDuffie School's name, mission, and intellectual property with plans to move the school to the former St. Hyacinth Seminary campus in Granby.

Holyoke-native John Foley agreed to buy the former MacDuffie property, with plans on making his own New England Prep school. While providing education to be available for a less affluent base. Foley, who runs an at-risk student program Project-13 in Holyoke has a history of working with at-risk middle-school children.

On June 1, 2011, five days before graduation in the school's final year in Springfield, the school's campus on Ames Hill Drive was devastated by a rare EF3 tornado that tore through several neighborhoods in the city and surrounding towns; caused more than $10 million in damage to the campus. Many student, faculty and staff were present on the campus at the time of the tornado and while there were no injuries, the campus was severely damaged with most of its trees uprooted as well as damage to buildings.

Springfield Commonwealth Academy opened in 2012, following a year of clean-up after the tornado devastated its campus.

Trademark dispute
In June 2016, the Boston Globe reported that Commonwealth School sued Commonwealth Academy, a high school in Springfield, Massachusetts, over the use of the name "Commonwealth". Founded in 1957, the Boston school had trademarked "Commonwealth School" in 2012. The Springfield school is now known as Springfield Commonwealth Academy.

References

External links
Official website

Educational institutions established in 2012
Private high schools in Massachusetts
Schools in Hampden County, Massachusetts
Private middle schools in Massachusetts
2012 establishments in Massachusetts